Taekwang Industrial Co, Ltd. is a South Korean chemical and textile company headquartered in the Jangchung-dong area of central Seoul, with plants located in China as well as in Korea. Founded by Lee Im Yong in 1950, the company has developed into a manufacturer of textiles, petrochemicals, wet weather and safety clothing products, and is part of the Taekwang Group. Taekwang Industrial had established a foundation in Seoul Sehwa High School. Taekwang produces Acelan brand spandex, raincoats, umbrellas, sodium cyanide, and black abaya fabric. Taekwang Industrial's electronic division, Taekwang Eroica, manufactured phones and audio electronics products, including the Eroica brands. However, the electronic division was shut down when Korea's audio market dried up in December 2005.

The revenue of Taekwang Industrial was 2.1 trillion KRW in 2011.

See also
Economy of South Korea
Taekwang Group

References

External link 
Taekwang Industrial Homepage 

Chemical companies of South Korea
Clothing companies of South Korea
Electronics companies of South Korea
Taekwang Group
Chemical companies established in 1950
South Korean companies established in 1950
Manufacturing companies based in Seoul